Kanaf Gurab (also Romanized as Kanaf Gūrāb, Kanaf Goorab, and Kanefgurāb) is a village in Rudboneh Rural District, Rudboneh District, Lahijan County, Gilan Province, Iran. At the 2006 census, its population was 141, in 41 families.

References 

Populated places in Lahijan County